The Grandes-Carrières (Large Quarries) District is the 69th administrative district of Paris located in the west of the 18e Arrondissement.

It gets its name from the former gypsum quarries, a basic component of plaster, that were located at the foot of Montmartre since the Middle Ages.

The Montmartre Cemetery is the main vestige of the main gypsum quarry of Paris.

The Grandes-Carrières District extends north from the Place de Clichy, bordered to the west by the Épinettes District and to the east by Montmartre and the Clignancourt District.

Sites and Monuments Of Interest

 Sainte-Geneviève des Grandes Carrières Church,
 Cité Montmartre-aux-Artistes.

Notes and references 

Districts of Paris